Capt. Thomas Moore House is a historic home located in the Queen Village neighborhood of Philadelphia, Pennsylvania. It is located in between the Nathaniel Irish House, to the south, and Widow Maloby's Tavern, to the north. It was built in 1767, and is a -story, three bay brick rowhouse.  This house is believed to have been built by Nathaniel Irish.

It was added to the National Register of Historic Places in 1972.  It is located in the South Front Street Historic District.

References

Houses on the National Register of Historic Places in Philadelphia
Houses completed in 1767
South Philadelphia
1767 establishments in Pennsylvania